Eustacia María Caridad del Río Hernández (29 March 1892 – 1975), better known as Caridad del Río, Caridad Mercader or Caritat Mercader, was a Cuban communist militant and an agent of the Soviet NKVD. She is also known for being the mother of Ramón Mercader, the assassin of Leon Trotsky, and for having personally participated in the operation.

Life
Caridad Mercader belonged to a wealthy family of  origin in early 20th-century Barcelona. She married Pablo Mercader, a member of Barcelona's industrial upper class, from whom she took the name, and with whom she had five children. After the end of her marriage to Mercader, she moved away from her family and permanently turned her back on the social class they represented. This decision was motivated in part by an episode of forced institutionalization during which she was subjected to electroshock therapy and her former husband's attempts to change her state of "sexual apathy" through visits to local brothels. Mercader began to frequent anarchist circles and soon attached herself to the communist ideology. She participated in the fights against the military uprising in Barcelona and joined the groups that left for Aragon, where she suffered severe injuries during an aerial attack.

Mercader achieved some notoriety as a member of the Unified Socialist Party of Catalonia (Partit Socialista Unificat de Catalunya, PSUC). In 1936 she led a propaganda mission to Mexico and later became an agent of the NKVD in Spain. Her son Ramón, also a member of the PSUC and an officer in the Spanish Republican Army, was also recruited by Soviet espionage during the war, likely with the involvement of his mother, and trained to assassinate Leon Trotsky. Caridad, who had settled in Paris some time in 1938, also participated in the operation. When Ramón was arrested after murdering Trotsky, she managed to leave Mexico and escape to the Soviet Union, where she was received with honors. She actively participated in conflicts between the different factions of exiled Spanish communists during her stay there.

In 1944 she obtained a permit to leave the country. However, contrary to the agreed upon conditions, she traveled to Mexico, where an undercover operation was being prepared to get Ramón Mercader out of jail. Mercader's presence proved to be counterproductive, as Mexican authorities tightened Ramón's prison conditions, causing the Soviets to abandon their efforts. Ramón, who according to his brother Luis never shared his mother's passion for the communist cause, never forgave her for this interference.

After the failure of the operation, Caridad once more took up residence in Paris, enjoying a Soviet pension. She occasionally traveled to the Soviet Union to visit her children, Luis and Ramón, the latter of which had settled there after serving his sentence in Mexico. She died in the French capital in 1975.

Notes

Footnotes

Bibliography

1892 births
1975 deaths
Spanish communists
NKVD
Unified Socialist Party of Catalonia
People from Santiago de Cuba
Recipients of the Order of Lenin